The Ohio State University is a public research university located in Columbus, Ohio.

The Ohio State University may also refer to the following regional campuses:
The Ohio State University, Agricultural Technical Institute located in Wooster, Ohio
The Ohio State University, Lima  located in Lima, Ohio
The Ohio State University, Mansfield located in Mansfield, Ohio
The Ohio State University, Marion located in Marion, Ohio
The Ohio State University, Newark located in Newark, Ohio